The Warp Riders Tour is a 2010–2011 worldwide concert tour by American heavy metal band The Sword. Beginning on October 1, 2010 in the United States, the tour is in promotion of the band's upcoming 2010 third album Warp Riders, released on August 24, 2010. Following the United States leg of the tour, the band joined Soundwave, a travelling music festival, in Australia in 2011. They will then perform an additional 12 shows in Europe. Prior to the tour, the band supported Metallica on their continuing World Magnetic Tour in September, and during the tour they also performed at the Austin City Limits Festival, between October 8 and October 10.

Between November and December 2010 a 26-date European leg was due to take place, but was cancelled early in October due to "circumstances beyond [the band's] control", later revealed to be the departure of drummer Trivett Wingo from the band. Drummer Kevin Fender joined The Sword as a touring member of the band in November, and is performing with the band on a rescheduled America leg throughout November and December, and on the Australian Soundwave festival leg in 2011.

Set lists
Original tour dates

{{hidden
| headercss  = background: #ccccff; font-size: 100%; width: 30%;
| contentcss = text-align: left; font-size: 100%; width: 30%;
| header     = October 2, 2010
| content    = 
"Acheron/Unearthing the Orb"
"Tres Brujas"
"Freya"
"How Heavy This Axe"
"The Chronomancer I: Hubris"
"Barael's Blade"
"Lawless Lands"
"Astraea's Dream"
"Maiden, Mother & Crone"
"The Warp Riders"
"Night City"
"Fire Lances of the Ancient Hyperzephyrians"
"Winter's Wolves"
"(The Night the Sky Cried) Tears of Fire"
Encore
"Cold Sweat" (Thin Lizzy cover)
"Iron Swan"
}}
{{hidden
| headercss  = background: #ccccff; font-size: 100%; width: 30%;
| contentcss = text-align: left; font-size: 100%; width: 30%;
| header     = October 3, 2010
| content    = 
"Acheron/Unearthing the Orb"
"Tres Brujas"
"Freya"
"How Heavy This Axe"
"Arrows in the Dark"
"The Chronomancer I: Hubris"
"Astraea's Dream"
"Night City"
"To Take the Black"
"The Black River"
"Iron Swan"
"(The Night the Sky Cried) Tears of Fire"
Encore
"The Horned Goddess"
"Barael's Blade"
"Winter's Wolves"
}}
{{hidden
| headercss  = background: #ccccff; font-size: 100%; width: 30%;
| contentcss = text-align: left; font-size: 100%; width: 30%;
| header     = October 6, 2010
| content    = 
"Acheron/Unearthing the Orb"
"Tres Brujas"
"Freya"
"How Heavy This Axe"
"Arrows in the Dark"
"The Chronomancer I: Hubris"
"Astraea's Dream"
"The Horned Goddess"
"To Take the Black"
"The Black River"
"Lawless Lands"
"The Warp Riders"
"(The Night the Sky Cried) Tears of Fire"
Encore
"Maiden, Mother & Crone"
"Iron Swan"
}}

Rescheduled tour dates
{{hidden
| headercss  = background: #ccccff; font-size: 100%; width: 30%;
| contentcss = text-align: left; font-size: 100%; width: 30%;
| header     = December 4, 2010
| content    = 
"Acheron/Unearthing the Orb"
"Tres Brujas"
"Barael's Blade"
"Arrows in the Dark"
"How Heavy This Axe"
"The Chronomancer I: Hubris"
"Fire Lances of the Ancient Hyperzephyrians"
"The Horned Goddess"
"Iron Swan"
"The Warp Riders"
"Night City"
"The Black River"
"Freya"
"(The Night the Sky Cried) Tears of Fire"
Encore
"Astraea's Dream"
"Winter's Wolves"
}}
{{hidden
| headercss  = background: #ccccff; font-size: 100%; width: 30%;
| contentcss = text-align: left; font-size: 100%; width: 30%;
| header     = December 6, 2010
| content    = 
"Acheron/Unearthing the Orb"
"Tres Brujas"
"Barael's Blade"
"Arrows in the Dark"
"How Heavy This Axe"
"The Chronomancer I: Hubris"
"Fire Lances of the Ancient Hyperzephyrians"
"The Horned Goddess"
"Iron Swan"
"The Warp Riders"
"Night City"
"The Chronomancer II: Nemesis"
"The Black River"
"Freya"
"(The Night the Sky Cried) Tears of Fire"
Encore
"Acheron/Unearthing the Orb"
"Winter's Wolves"
}}
{{hidden
| headercss  = background: #ccccff; font-size: 100%; width: 30%;
| contentcss = text-align: left; font-size: 100%; width: 30%;
| header     = December 7, 2010
| content    = 
"Acheron/Unearthing the Orb"
"Tres Brujas"
"Barael's Blade"
"Arrows in the Dark"
"How Heavy This Axe"
"The Chronomancer I: Hubris"
"Fire Lances of the Ancient Hyperzephyrians"
"Lawless Lands"
"March of the Lor"
"Iron Swan"
"Maiden, Mother & Crone"
"The Warp Riders"
"Night City"
"Freya"
"(The Night the Sky Cried) Tears of Fire"
Encore
"Astraea's Dream"
"Winter's Wolves"
}}
{{hidden
| headercss  = background: #ccccff; font-size: 100%; width: 30%;
| contentcss = text-align: left; font-size: 100%; width: 30%;
| header     = December 8, 2010
| content    = 
"Acheron/Unearthing the Orb"
"Tres Brujas"
"Barael's Blade"
"Arrows in the Dark"
"How Heavy This Axe"
"The Chronomancer I: Hubris"
"Fire Lances of the Ancient Hyperzephyrians"
"Lawless Lands"
"Maiden, Mother & Crone"
"Night City"
"The Chronomancer II: Nemesis"
"The Horned Goddess"
"The Black River"
"Freya"
"Iron Swan"
"(The Night the Sky Cried) Tears of Fire"
Encore
"Astraea's Dream"
"Winter's Wolves"
}}
{{hidden
| headercss  = background: #ccccff; font-size: 100%; width: 30%;
| contentcss = text-align: left; font-size: 100%; width: 30%;
| header     = December 12, 2010
| content    = 
"Acheron/Unearthing the Orb"
"Tres Brujas"
"Barael's Blade"
"Arrows in the Dark"
"How Heavy This Axe"
"Lawless Lands"
"Fire Lances of the Ancient Hyperzephyrians"
"The Chronomancer II: Nemesis"
"The Horned Goddess"
"Iron Swan"
"Lords"
"Night City"
"Freya"
"The Black River"
"(The Night the Sky Cried) Tears of Fire"
Encore
"Winter's Wolves"
}}

Tour dates

References

General

Specific

2010 concert tours
2011 concert tours
The Sword concert tours